Druzhba (lit. friendship; before 1962: Khutir-Mykhailivskyi) is a town in the Shostka Raion of the Sumy Oblast, Ukraine.

Geography
The city is located in the northern part of Sumy Oblast and lies in the valley of the Zhuravka River and its tributaries. The southeastern part of the surrounding areas is swampy. This is the land of forests: pine grows from conifers on the hills, and spruce in the lowlands, birch, oak, alder are often found here. A quiet Ivotka River flows through the forest. The  and several railway branches pass through the city.

History 

In the past, two settlements, Zhuravka and Yurasivka were in Cossack Hetmanate. Zhuravka village was named after the Zhuravka  River (Журавка), on which it is located. In late 17th century, these villages belonged to Andriy Hamaliya, whose son was a like-minded person and supporter of Ivan Mazepa. After the Battle of Poltava (1709) tsar Peter I gave these villages to landowner Golovin, whose descendants sold them later to the Kochubey family. 

In early 1830's Zhuravka, Yurasivka and their surroundings were bought by industrialist M. Tereshchenko. He founded a sugar refinery, which operated till 1995.  A new settlement was formed as the factory workers settled nearby. Tereshchenko named this after his son Mykhailo. Name Khutir-Mykhailivskyi was first used in 1855 linked to construction of sugar refinery. The settlements Yurasivka and Khutir-Mykhailivskyi were then part of Glukhovsky Uyezd in Chernigov Governorate of the Russian Empire. Narrow-gauge railway was built in 1860s from line Voronezh-Zernovye. In 1907 additional railway lines were built; thus Khutir-Mykhailivskyi became a hub station. 

In the villages subordinated to Mykhailivka Village Council, peasants were forcibly driven into collective farms in 1929-1930. 

In 1932-1933 those peasants survived the Stalinist genocide of Ukrainians. During World War II, Druzhba was occupied by Axis troops from October 1941 to August 1943. There was a concentration camp in which 17 thousand people died.   

In 1956 (or 1958) Khutir-Mykhailivskyi was given a status of urban-type settlement. There was a sugar plant, a cinder block factory, three secondary schools, five libraries, a club and a stadium.

Town Druzhba was founded in the 1962 when three settlements Zhuravka, Yurasivka and Khutir Mykhailivskyi were put together. It was part of Yampil Raion until summer 2020, when it became part of larger Shostka Raion.

There are three schools in the city — two comprehensive I-III degrees and one comprehensive I-II degrees, a nursery-kindergarten, two hospitals, a pharmacy, a house of culture, a railwaymen club, a branch of Yampil Music and children's and youth sports schools. There are also four library establishments, a museum of local artifacts, and a stadium. There are two Orthodox churches.

In the center of the city, at the square of Eternal Glory, a memorial was erected for soldiers who died during the Second World War, there is also the tomb of an unknown soldier and mass graves.

Demographics

Population

Ethnicity 
As of 2001:

Native language 
As of 2001:

Climate

Transport 
The Khutir-Mikhailivskyi railway station is the first Ukrainian station on line Bryansk–Konotop. An other line connects it to Unecha and Bilopillia. The distance to Sumy via railway is 244 km (152 mi) but is only 191 km (119 mi) via highway. The distance to Kyiv via railway is 336 km (209 km) but is 344 km (214 mi) by highway.

References

Cities in Sumy Oblast
Glukhovsky Uyezd
Cities of district significance in Ukraine